Yury Alekseyevich Kashirin (born 20 January 1959) is a retired Soviet cyclist who specialized in road racing. He was part of the Soviet team that won the time trial event at the 1980 Summer Olympics. Individually, he finished in 23rd place in the road race, helping Sergei Sukhoruchenkov and Yury Barinov to win the race. He also won a silver and a bronze medal in the team time trial at the 1981 and 1982 UCI Road World Championships.

Between 1979 and 1984 Kashirin took part in several international competitions, winning the Milk Race in 1979 and 1982 and the Tour de Bretagne Cycliste in 1983. He retired in 1986 and worked as a cycling coach. In 1987 he led the junior and in 1988 the senior Soviet teams. He then worked with the national teams of Egypt and Canada, preparing the Canadian team for three Olympic Games. In 2008 he returned to Russia.

References

1959 births
Living people
Soviet male cyclists
Russian male cyclists
Olympic cyclists of the Soviet Union
Cyclists at the 1980 Summer Olympics
Olympic medalists in cycling
Olympic gold medalists for the Soviet Union
People from Liskinsky District
UCI Road World Champions (elite men)
Medalists at the 1980 Summer Olympics
Russian State University of Physical Education, Sport, Youth and Tourism alumni
Sportspeople from Voronezh Oblast